Doukas is a mountain village and a community in the municipal unit of Foloi, Elis, Greece. In 2011 its population was 34 for the village and 112 for the community, which includes the village Lasdikas. Situated at approximately 600 m above sea level, its climate is relatively cool during the summer and wet during the winter. Doukas is 2 km northwest of Lalas, 4 km east of Kryoneri and 11 km northeast of Olympia. The village was affected by the 2007 Greek forest fires.

Population

See also

List of settlements in Elis

External links
 Doukas GTP Travel Pages

References

Populated places in Elis